Elm View is an unincorporated community in Fresno County, California.

References

Unincorporated communities in California
Unincorporated communities in Fresno County, California